An interactive storybook (or CD-ROM storybook,) is a children's story packaged with animated graphics, sound or other interactive elements (e.g., word pronunciation). Such stories are usually published as software on CD-ROMs. They have also been referred to as computer books, picture book programs, books-on-disk, talking books, or living books.

This software is targeted at young readers (usually kindergarten to second grade) for educational purposes.

In their seminal work To Instruct and Delight: Children's and Young Adults' Literature on CD-ROM, H. Bennett wrote, "Something magical and non-threatening happens when a children's story weds a computer."

Children's Tech Review wrote that when a children's book comes to a touch screen, it can be called many names, including: “ebooks,” “living books,” “digital story books,” or even “app books.”

Examples
 Disney's Animated Storybook
 Europress Bookshelf
 Living Books
 Magic Tales
 Playtoons
 Reader Rabbit's Reading Development Library

Pitfalls
There are studies indicating that some students will simply "cruise through" a story, either just playing with the graphics or not trying to read it themselves.

References

External links 
 Reframing research and literacy pedagogy relating to CD narratives: Addressing 'radical change' in digital age literature for children
 http://www.schwimmenlernenimnetz.de/veroeffentlichungen/holue_adventure.pdf

Children's literature
Children's educational video games